Robert W. Claude is a United States Air Force brigadier general who serves as the mobilization assistant to the commander of the United States Space Command. He previously served as the director of operations, training, and force development of the U.S. Space Command.

References

External links
 

Year of birth missing (living people)
Living people
Place of birth missing (living people)
United States Air Force generals